Families Belong Together refers both to an advocacy campaign devoted to reuniting  immigrant families that were separated at the US-Mexico border by a Trump administration policy introduced in spring 2018, and also specifically to a series of protests on June 30, 2018 in Washington, D.C., New York City, and 700 other cities and towns in the United States. Very large crowds turned out to those events despite heat waves in many areas, including in Washington, D.C.

History 
The "zero tolerance" policy introduced by the Trump Administration in spring 2018 was the immediate catalyst for the Families Belong Together mass mobilization in June 2018, as media outlets began reporting on children being held in cages and in detention facilities after having been separated from their parents or guardians after crossing the border. The news organization Pro Publica released widely-circulated audio of one group of children crying. As public shock and outrage grew, a small group of women activists, advocates, and public officials began conferring to organize a public response, including Anna Galland, then Executive Director at MoveOn Civic Action; Jessica Morales Rocketto, then Political Director of the National Domestic Workers Alliance; Congresswoman Pramila Jayapal (D. Wash.); and Ai-jen Poo, Executive Director of the National Domestic Workers Alliance. That group's organizing led to a call for peaceful protests on Saturday, June 30, 2018, and hundreds of thousands of people turned out for those events.

Participants 
Many of those protesting in June 2018 had participated in previous anti-Trump protests and actions, while others were new to immigration activism, with parents who felt called into action based on the reported stories of separations. Protesters at the events in June 2018 participated in both major cities and also more rural regions like Appalachia and Wyoming. Protests were also held internationally. Some protesters compared the detainment of children by the U.S. government to the Nazi concentration camps.

Support from celebrities and other public figures 
A number of prominent public figures spoke out around the time of the June 2018 protests to criticize the Trump Administration's policy. Former First Lady Laura Bush issued a statement saying the policy "broke her heart."

Celebrities who appeared at protests around the country included: 
Washington DC: Lin-Manuel Miranda, America Ferrara, Alicia Keys, Diane Guerrero  
Los Angeles: Laura Dern, Mira Sorvino, Chrissy Teigen, John Legend, Lea Thompson, Patton Oswalt, Laverne Cox, Chadwick Boseman, David Arquette
New York City: Kerry Washington, Alysia Reiner, Amy Schumer, Padma Lakshmi, Vincent D'Onofrio, Carrie Coon, Alec Baldwin, Ellen Page
San Francisco: Joan Baez

Counter-protests 

At some of the locations there were counter protesters, resulting in at least one arrest. A counter-protester was arrested at Huntsville, Alabama after displaying a gun, and reportedly stating "I will shoot everyone here." In Phoenix, Arizona, about 25 counter-protesters from patriot movement proclaimed their opposition to the protests using signs and a megaphone, and engaging others at the protests near Arizona State Capitol, while the event remained mostly peaceful.

Locations

United States

International

Gallery

See also
 List of protest marches on Washington, D.C.

References

External links 
 

2018 protests
Articles containing video clips
Protests against Donald Trump
June 2018 events in the United States
2018 in American politics
Immigration to the United States
Immigration policy of Donald Trump
Immigration-related protests